Coteaux du Lizon is a commune in the department of Jura, eastern France. The municipality was established on 1 January 2017 by merger of the former communes of Saint-Lupicin (the seat) and Cuttura.

Geography 

Coteaux du Lizon is a little town located in the Parc naturel régional du Haut-Jura in Bourgogne-Franche-Comté, Eastern France.

The city is cut in two parts by the narrow but deep valley of the Lizon, a small river about 7 km long that cuts a little canyon in the vicinity of Coteaux du Lizon. The commune also has two vast coombs, one of which is towards the hamlet of "Grande-Maison" on the heights of the commune at the foot of the Roche d'Antre, which has climatic characteristics close to those of the coombs of la Brévine or Mouthe. Coteaux du Lizon is surrounded by the Roche d'Antre massif to the west and by the little mountains on which Avignon-lès-Saint-Claude is situated to the east. Although it is in the Haut-Jura, none of the peaks in the territory of the municipality exceeds 1000 m, but nevertheless, at 5 km to the south, there is the Crêt de Surmontant, which peaks at 1065 m. Note that the maximum altitude of its canton is near Lamoura at the Crêt Pela, culminating at 1495m.

The Lizon is the main watercourse crossing the commune. There is also the Cuttura dam, a small water reserve located between Cuttura and Saint-Lupicin. There are many small mountain streams in the municipality.

Climate 

Under the Köppen system, Coteaux du Lizon is pretty close to a warm-summer humid continental climate (Köppen: Dfb) but remains oceanic (Köppen: Cfb) due to its coldest month, slightly above freezing on average due to the winter highs being in the single digits. Coteaux du Lizon experiences a wet climate throughout the year including warm to hot, stormy summers and cold, very snowy winters.

Population

See also 
Communes of the Jura department

References 

Communes of Jura (department)